Put Yo Hood Up is the third studio album by Lil Jon & the East Side Boyz. It was certified Gold by the RIAA for sales of over 500,000 copies.

Track listing
 "Y'all Ain't Ready"
 "Uhh Ohh"(featuring Khujo Goodie of Goodie Mob & Bo Hagon)
 "Put Yo Hood Up"
 "Bia' Bia'" (featuring Ludacris, Too Short, Big Kap & Chyna Whyte)
 "Bia' Bia' Check In" (Skit)
 "Who U Wit"
 "Let My Nuts Go" (featuring Too Short, Quint Black & The Nation Riders)
 "Move Bitch" (featuring Three 6 Mafia, Gangsta Boo, YoungBloodZ, Chyna Whyte & Don Yute)
 "Heads Off" (My Niggas) (featuring M.O.P.)
 "Sexlude" (Skit)
 "Can't Stop Pimpin'" (featuring Oobie, 8Ball & MJG)
 "Bounce Dat" (featuring Chyna Whyte)
 "Nothins Free" (featuring Oobie)
 "Searcylude" (skit)
 "Where Dem Girlz At" (featuring Sky Keeton)
 "I Like Dem Girlz" (featuring Jazze Pha)
 "Nasty Girl" (featuring Oobie)
 "DJ Hershey Live At The Blue Flamelude" (Skit)
 "Go Shawty Go" (featuring Kilo Ali)
 "Outro Chynalude" (Skit) (featuring Chyna Whyte, A-Men, J-Ax)
 "Bia' Bia' 2" [*](featuring Chyna Whyte & Too Short)

Charts

References

2001 albums
Lil Jon & the East Side Boyz albums
Albums produced by Lil Jon